Deora is a census town in the Swarupnagar CD block in the  Basirhat subdivision of North 24 Parganas district in the state of West Bengal, India.

Geography

Location

Area overview
The area shown in the map is a part of the Ichhamati-Raimangal Plain, located in the lower Ganges Delta. It contains soil of mature black or brownish loam to recent alluvium. Numerous rivers, creeks and khals criss-cross the area. The tip of the Sundarbans National Park is visible in the lower part of the map (shown in green but not marked). The larger full screen map shows the full forest area. A large section of the area is a part of the Sundarbans settlements. The densely populated area is overwhelmingly a rural area. Only 12.96% of the population lives in the urban areas and 87.04% of the population lives in the rural areas.

Note: The map alongside presents some of the notable locations in the subdivision. All places marked in the map are linked in the larger full screen map.

Demographics
According to the 2011 Census of India, Deora had a total population of 4,360, of which 2,255 (52%) were males and 2,105 (48%) were females. Population in the age range 0–6 years was 296. The total number of literate persons in Deora was 3,716 (91.44% of the population over 6 years).

Infrastructure
According to the District Census Handbook, North Twenty Four Parganas,  2011, Deora covered an area of 1.5904 km2. It had 12 km roads with both open and closed drains. The protected water-supply involved overhead tank and tap water from treated sources. It had 1,200 domestic electric connections and 20 road lighting points. Among the medical facilities it had 1 dispensary/ health centre. Among the educational facilities, it had 7 primary schools, 4 middle schools, 1 secondary school and 1 higher secondary school. The nearest college was 4 km away at Gobardanga. Deora produces paddy, jute and vegetables.

References

Cities and towns in North 24 Parganas district